Richard Danks (March 1865 – November 1929) was an English footballer who played as a forward for Wolverhampton Wanderers and Burslem Port Vale.

Career
Danks played for Wolverhampton Wanderers, and made three guest appearances for Burslem Port Vale whilst still at Wolves, including his debut on a 14 January 1888 friendly with South Shore where he bagged two goals in a 2–2 home draw. He switched to the Vale permanently in the summer of 1888. He played regular football in the 1888–89 season, but after being appointed club secretary in October 1889 played only in emergency circumstances. He served as secretary until November 1893 and was released as a player at the end of the 1893–94 season. He had played 42 games (including one in the Football League Second Division, 19 friendlies, 15 in the Football Combination and four in the Midland League) and scored eight goals (five in friendlies, two in the Combination and one cup goals) for the club.

Career statistics
Source:

References

1865 births
1929 deaths
People from Bilston
English footballers
Association football forwards
Port Vale F.C. players
Midland Football League players
English Football League players
Port Vale F.C. non-playing staff